Archery at the 1968 Summer Paralympics consisted of thirteen events, eight for men and five for women.

Medal table

Participating nations

Medal summary

Men's events

Women's events

References 

 

1968 Summer Paralympics events
1968
Paralympics